The Guild is an online sitcom about the lives of an online guild "The Knights of Good", with each webisode 3–9 minutes long. The first episode was posted July 27, 2007. It was released via The Guild's official website, effinfunny.com and YouTube; on iTunes and Zune Marketplace as a podcast; and is available for download from the Xbox Live Marketplace. The show follows the life of Codex, the healer of The Knights of Good, who attempts to lead a normal life after one of her guildmates shows up on her doorstep.

The Guild was written by Felicia Day (who stars as Codex), directed by Jane Selle Morgan and Greg Benson (season 1), Sean Becker (seasons 2–5), and Chris Preksta (Season 6), and produced by Felicia Day, Jane Selle Morgan and Kim Evey.

Overall, 70 episodes of The Guild were released over six seasons. All information, lengths, descriptions and release dates, prior to season 5, as they appeared on The Guild's website.

The sixth season of The Guild premiered on Felicia Day's YouTube channel, Geek & Sundry on October 2, 2012. Following the conclusion of the sixth season, Day announced that the series was complete.

Series overview

Episodes

Season 1 (2007–2008)

Season 2 (2008–2009)

Season 3 (2009)

Season 4 (2010)

Season 5 (2011)

Season 6 (2012–2013)

Specials and musicals

References

Lists of web series episodes
Fictional guilds